Emma Croker (née  Layland; born 29 September 1982) is an English female rugby union player, weight lifter and teacher. She represented  at the 2010 Women's Rugby World Cup and she was chosen for the 2014 Women's Rugby World Cup squad. She is married and she previously lead the P.E department at Swakeleys School for Girls. She is now director of Sport at Queens College London. .

References

External links
Player Profile

1982 births
Living people
21st-century English educators
21st-century English women
England women's international rugby union players
English female rugby union players
Rugby union players from Chelmsford